Filip Hrgović (born 4 June 1992) is a Croatian professional boxer who has held the WBC International title in 2018 and the IBF International title in 2020. As an amateur he won the gold medal at the 2015 European Amateur Boxing Championships and bronze at the 2016 Summer Olympics.

As of December 2021, The Ring ranks him as the #9 heavyweight in the world.

Early life 
Filip was born on 4 June 1992 in Zagreb, Croatia, to Petar and Iva Hrgović. His father, who was born in Livno, Bosnia and Herzegovina worked for Croatian Motorways, while his mom, a native of the Croatian capital Zagreb is a graduate in kinesiology and was focused on raising Filip and his four other siblings.

Hrgović recalls being overweight as a child, even earning the nickname "fatty" along the way. He would often end up in trouble and be reprimanded for it.

Filip's first sport was basketball at age 8, which he took up as a means to lose weight. He even managed to win the national championship with his club Dubrava but was forced to retire due to back and knee injuries. He then took up swimming, which would also last only a short period of time.

He started boxing at the age of 13 in the boxing club Leonardo under the tutelage of coach Leonardo Pijetraj in his home district of Sesvete in Zagreb. His mother wasn't overly happy with Filip's decision to take up boxing as a profession, but his mind was already made up.

In 2015, Hrgović was awarded the Franjo Bučar State Award for Sport and the award for the best sportsman of Zagreb. In 2016, Hrgović was awarded the Order of Danica Hrvatska with face of Franjo Bučar.

Amateur career

AIBA
Hrgović participated in the 2010 AIBA Youth World Boxing Championships, held in Baku, Azerbaijan. He beat Jozsef Zsigmund in the first round, Fargan Omarov in the quarterfinals and Joseph Parker in the semifinals to earn a place in the tournament finals, where he faced Tony Yoka. It was the first of three future meetings in amateur competitions. He beat Yoka by points to win the gold medal. Hrgović earned a 10 000 kuna payout from the Croatian Boxing Federation for this victory.

In April 2012, Hrgović took part in the European Olympic Qualification tournament, competing in the super heavyweight category. Despite scoring stoppage victories over Nikita Maculevics and Kaspar Vaha in the preliminary rounds, he would lose by decision to Magomed Omarov in the quarterfinals.

Hrgović took part in the 2013 AIBA World Boxing Championships as well. He beat Guangming Gu by stoppage and Mirzohidjon Abdullaev by decision in the preliminary rounds, to earn a place in the quarterfinals. He lost his quarterfinals bout to Roberto Cammarelle by decision.

Hrgović was the man credited for the cancellation of the David Haye vs Tyson Fury fight in 2013, after he cut Haye in a sparring session. He was also Kubrat Pulev's sparring partner for his fight against Wladimir Klitschko in 2014.

European competitions
In May 2014, Hrgović fought in the Croatian National Boxing Championship. He won the gold medal by beating Pero Konsuo in the quarterfinal, Josip Granic in the semifinal and Ivan Andrasic in the finals. Hrgović likewise won the 2015 iteration of the tournament as well.

Hrgović qualified for the 2015 European Amateur Boxing Championships. Victories over Dean Gardiner, Mikheil Bakhtidze and Mihai Nistor earned Hrgović a place in the finals, where he was to fight Florian Schulz. It was the first time in eleven year that a Croatian boxer qualified for the finals of the European Amateur Boxing Championships. He won the tournament with a unanimous decision win against Schulz.

He was named March Boxer of the Month in 2015 by AIBA.

2016 Olympic games

The last amateur competition Hrgović competed in was the 2016 Summer Olympics. After beating Ali Eren Demirezen by unanimous decision, Hrgović was scheduled to fight Lenier Pero in the quarterfinals. He beat Pero by TKO. He advanced to the semifinals, where he fought a rubber match with Tony Yoka. Yoka won the fight by a tight split decision, bringing Hrgović's overall score against him to 1–2 in amateur competitions. Despite this loss, Hrgović won a bronze medal.

After Olympics, he was awarded Order of Danica Hrvatska with face of Franjo Bučar by President of Croatia, Kolinda Grabar-Kitarović, for extraordinary sports success and winning a medal at Olympics, also for promotion of sports and the reputation of the Croatia in the world.

Professional career

Early career

Career beginnings
On 30 September 2017, Hrgović started his professional career with a first-round stoppage victory over Raphael Zumbano of Brazil. Hrgović signed a deal with Sauerland Promotions following his debut.

For his second professional fight, Hrgović was scheduled to fight the former Czech Heavyweight boxing champion Pavel Sour. The fight was evenly contested for the majority of the first round, until Hrgović landed a flurry 30 seconds before the end, knocking out Sour with a right hook.

Hrgović was scheduled to fight the Tom Little, who was on a three-fight winning streak, on the undercard of the World Boxing Super Series semi-final clash between Oleksandr Usyk and Mairis Briedis. Hrgović dominated throughout the fight, pressuring with a jab-right hand combination. He finally managed to knock Little down near the end of the fourth round, dropping his opponent with a right straight. Although Little managed to beat the ten-count, he had a cut over his left eye, and would quickly lose by technical knockout.

Hrgović was expected to face Sean Turner, at the time the #46 ranked heavyweight according to Boxrec, on the undercard of the WBSS semifinal bout contested by Callum Smith and Nieky Holzken. Hrgović remained dominant in all eight rounds, with two of the three judges scoring the fight 80–72 in his favor, and the third judge scoring it 79–73.

In his fifth professional fight, Hrgović was scheduled to fight the undefeated Mexican heavyweight Filiberto Tovar. It was the first time in Hrgović's career that he was scheduled to fight a ten-round bout. Hrgović once again dominated, stunning Tovar in first, second and third rounds, although he couldn't knock him down. Midway through the fourth round, Tovar's corner threw in the towel, awarding Hrgović a TKO victory.

Following his five straight victories, Hrgović was shortlisted for The Ring magazine Prospect of the Year award.

WBC International champion
Hrgović was scheduled to fight Amir Mansour on September 8, 2018, for the WBC International heavyweight title. It was both the first time Hrgović fought in his native Zagreb, as well as the first time he was scheduled to fight in a twelve-round bout. In the first round, Hrgović utilized half-feints and jabs to pressure his opponent back, relying on his height and length to insulate him from Mansour's lunges. There was a brief break in action during the second round, after Mansour landed a blow to the back of Hrgović's head. After the break, the fight continued in the previous tempo, with Hrgović achieving a technical knockout win after knocking Mansour down twice in the third round.

Hrgović was expected to make the first defense of his secondary title against Ytalo Perea on December 8, 2018, at the Dražen Petrović Basketball Hall in Zagreb, Croatia. It was scheduled to be broadcast exclusively by RTL, domestically in Croatia. Perea was forced to withdraw two days prior to the bout due to travel visa issues, and was replaced by the one-time WBC heavyweight title challenger Kevin Johnson. Hrgović retained his title by unanimous decision, with all three judges awarding him all eight rounds of the fight. He dominated the bout from start to finish and came close to knocking Johnson down with an overhand right in the eight round, although he was unable to finish him. Hrgović was scheduled to make his second title defense against the 15-1 Gregory Corbin on May 25, 2019 at the MGM National Harbor in Oxon Hill. The bout was broadcast domestically in Croatia by RTL and internationally by DAZN. It was Hrgović's United States debut, as well as his DAZN debut. He won the fight by a first-round knockout, stopping Corbin after just 60 seconds, with his fourth strike of the bout.

Hrgović had his first fight in Mexico on August 24, 2019, against Mario Heredia, at the Centro de Usos Multiples in Hermosillo, Mexico. Heredia entered the fight off an upset with against Samuel Peter, but was seen as an easy fight for Hrgović, as he had lost five of his past six bouts. Although he started slowly, Hrgović maintained a steady stream of jabs, right straights and hooks throughout the first round. Heredia attempted to adjust by landing a number of body shots in the second round, which failed to stop the forward movement of Hrgović. The fight ended in the third round, as Heredia was knocked out with a right-left hook combination.

On 7 December 2019, on the undercard of Ruiz Jr. vs. Joshua II, Hrgović, then ranked #9 by the WBA and IBF, and #11 by the WBC, had what is perhaps his most notable win to date, a third-round knockout against Éric Molina. He dominated the fight from the first bell, dropping Molina twice; once in the first round and again in the second, before finally closing out with a third knockdown in the third round, from which Molina wasn't able to get up. Hrgović was expected to next face Ondřej Pála in the co-main event of the Dina Thorslund vs Nina Radovanovic title fight, held on September 26, 2020, at the Struer Energi Park in Struer, Denmark. Three days before the fight, Pála withdrew for an undisclosed reason, and was replaced on short notice by Alexandre Kartozia. Hrgović justified his role as the betting favorite, pressuring Kartozia throughout the fight, and knocking him out with a left-right combination at the 1:07 minute mark.

IBF International champion
Two months after his victory over Kartozia, Hrgović was scheduled to fight Rydell Booker for the vacant IBF International Heavyweight title o November 7, 2020, at the Seminole Hard Rock Hotel & Casino, in Hollywood, Florida, in his return to the United States. Hrgović entered the bout as a -10000 betting favorite, while most odds-makers had Booker at +1400. He justified his role as the betting favorite, stopping Booker with a flurry of punches in the fifth round.

Following Hrgović's victory over Booker, Michael Hunter called for a fight between the two, claiming he had asked for the fight numerous times before. Although the fight didn't materialize at the time, IBF announced in February 2021 that the #5 ranked Hrgović and #4 ranked Hunter would fight to determine who would be the mandatory challenger for Anthony Joshua’s heavyweight title. The organization gave both fighters until February 26, 2021, to accept the bout. Both fighters accepted the fight, although the time and place of it weren't immediately revealed, as they were to be determined after a bidding took place on April 6, 2021. The bidding was later postponed. The purse bid was eventually won by Eddie Hearn’s Matchroom Boxing, who bid $606 666 for the fight, with a 60-40 split in favor of Hunter. Hunter withdrew from the bout following the purse bid.

As the Hunter fight failed to pan out, Hrgović was instead scheduled to defend his IBF International Heavyweight Title against the undefeated Marko Radonjic on September 10, 2021, at Wörthersee Stadion in Klagenfurt, Austria. Hrgović thoroughly dominated his opponent, knocking him down seven times before Radonjić retired from the bout after the third round. Hrgović made his second IBF International heavyweight title defense against Scott Alexander at the MGM Grand Las Vegas in Las Vegas, United States on December 4, 2021. The bout was set for the undercard of a DAZN card headlined by Devin Haney and Joseph Diaz. On November 30, five days before the fight, it was announced that Alexander had withdrawn from the fight and would be replaced by Emir Ahmatović. Hrgović won the fight by technical knockout, 30 seconds into the third round. Prior to the stoppage, he knocked Ahmetović down twice towards the end of the second round.

Rise up the ranks

Hrgović vs. Zhang
On January 3, 2022, the IBF sent an invitation to Hrgović and Luis Ortiz to enter talks for a final title eliminator. Hrgović immediately accepted the offer, with his promoters stating: "Challenge accepted by Filip Hrgovic, [Three] days and counting for Luis Ortiz to accept". Ortiz refused, citing inability to compete due to injury. IBF then invited the next highest ranked heavyweight contender, Joseph Parker, to enter talks for a title eliminator bout. Parker refused to enter talks as well, due to recovering from injuries. On January 10, the same invitation was extended to Tony Yoka. Yoka accepted the offer on January 13. The fight was supposed to be a rematch of their 2016 Summer Olympics semi-final bout, which Yoka narrowly won on points. IBF later ruled Yoka ineligible to enter an agreement with any opponent other than Martin Bakole, as the two had already signed contracts to face each other. On January 26, both Andy Ruiz Jr. and Murat Gassiev received invitations to enter into negotiations with Hrgović, which they refused five days later, citing lingering injuries as the reason for refusal. On February 7, it was revealed that the #13 ranked Chinese heavyweight Zhilei Zhang had accepted the invitation to enter into negotiations with Hrgović.

A purse bid was called by the organization on February 14, as the two camps failed to come to terms. Matchroom and Wasserman won the purse bid a joint bid of $650 000. Hrgović was entitled to a 60% split ($390 000), while Zhang received a 40% split of the purse ($260 000). The bout was expected to take place on May 7, 2022, on the Canelo Álvarez vs. Dmitry Bivol undercard, as the co-feature to the main event. Hrgović withdrew from the bout on May 2, following the death of his father. The fight was rescheduled for the Oleksandr Usyk vs Anthony Joshua II undercard. It took place at the King Abdullah Sports City in Jeddah, Saudi Arabia on August 20, 2022, as part of a DAZN pay-per-view.

Despite a poor start, Hrgović was able to win the fight by unanimous decision. Judges Leszek Jankowiak and Robin Taylor scored the bout 115–112 in his favor, while judge Pawel Kardyni awarded Hrgović a 114–113 scorecard. Hrgović was knocked down with a check right hook in the back of the head, which is formally prohibited, in the last thirty seconds of the opening round and appeared to struggle with Zhang's power in the early parts of the fight. As it went on however, the Chinese boxer grew more exhausted and the volume of Hrgović was enough to earn him the latter rounds. The fight result was slightly controversial, and there was some disagreement among the media outlets as to the scoring. For example, BadLeftHook scored the fight 115–112 for Zhang, while Boxingscene had it 114–113 Hrgović.

Hrgović vs. Ruiz
On November 13, 2022, the IBF formally ordered their heavyweight champion Oleksandr Usyk to enter into negotiations with Hrgović, who was at the time the mandatory challenger for the title.  Matchroom and Wasserman Boxing later confirmed that Hrgović opted to forgo the negotiation period and head straight to a purse bid. The IBF rescinded their order on January 9, 2023, as they recognized that the WBA was next in the “rotation” for a mandatory title defense, with the stipulation that the winner would face Hrgović within 180 days. Ten days later, it was revealed that the IBF had ordered an interim title fight between Hrgović and the former unified heavyweight champion Andy Ruiz Jr. As the two camps couldn't come to an agreement, the IBF called for a purse bid to be held on February 28, which was eventually moved up to February 23. Ruiz declined to move forward with the interim championship bout hours before the purse bid was supposed to be held.

Professional boxing record

References

External links
 
 
 
 
 
Filip Hrgovic Official Website
Filip Hrgovic – Profile, News Archive & Current Rankings at Box.Live

1992 births
Living people
Heavyweight boxers
Croatian male boxers
Olympic boxers of Croatia
Boxers at the 2016 Summer Olympics
Sportspeople from Zagreb
Olympic bronze medalists for Croatia
Olympic medalists in boxing
Medalists at the 2016 Summer Olympics